Ikapote Tupai (born 22 February 1996) is a New Zealand born, Australian rugby union player who played for the  in the Super Rugby competition.  His position of choice is flanker.

References

Super Rugby statistics

Australian rugby union players
1996 births
Living people
New Zealand emigrants to Australia
Australian sportspeople of Tongan descent
Australian people of New Zealand descent
Rugby union flankers
Rugby union number eights
Melbourne Rising players
Melbourne Rebels players
Rugby union players from Auckland